Suppression of tumorigenicity 2  is a gene that in humans is located on chromosome 11p14.3-p12. This region (ST2; GeneID: 6761) on chromosome 11 represents a putative locus that is associated with various forms of cancer. 

It has been confused in the published literature  with the IL1RL1 gene (GeneID: 9173), which has the alias ST2, but is located on chromosome 2 and encodes a member of the interleukin 1 receptor family, IL1RL1.

References

Genes on human chromosome 11